is a Japanese role-playing game series targeted at a female demographic audience from Koei. The title is Italian for The Golden String.

The story was adapted into a manga by the game's character designer, Yuki Kure, which is serialized in LaLa magazine. An anime adaptation, titled La Corda d'Oro: Primo Passo, was first broadcast by TV Tokyo from October 2006 to March 2007. The anime also premiered on Animax. It was aired across its respective networks worldwide, including Hong Kong and Taiwan, and also translated and dubbed into English for its English language networks in Southeast Asia and South Asia, and other regions. Sentai Filmworks acquired North American rights to the series, has released it in two half-season box sets, and is streaming it online. The first of a 2-episode anime special, entitled La Corda d'Oro: Secondo Passo, was aired by Kids Station on March 26, 2009, but the season ends on a cliffhanger. Secondo Passo was meant strictly  to promote the video game.

Plot

Kahoko Hino is a student in the General Education section of Seiso Academy. One day she runs into Lili, a musical fairy, who grants her a magical violin and a place in the school's annual musical competition. Kahoko refuses, only to be pressed on by Lili until she accepts the instrument and place in the competition. As she practices, Kahoko is amazed that she can play any musical piece as long as she knows the tune and plays it with her heart. As the competition goes on, she becomes more and more attached to the people she is trying to compete with.

Characters

 (game);  (anime and drama CD)

Hino is a 2nd year student at Seiso Academy and is in the General Education department. She has a warm and friendly personality and is very honest and straightforward, as shown from the way she expresses herself through her violin. She remains oblivious throughout the story to the attention of the males surrounding her. She lives with her mother, older sister and older brother, though nobody knows who is her father because there is no evidence. She is also half-hearted. She was given a violin by the fairy Lily for being able to see him. At first she was very nervous about this but soon finds that with the help of the other characters she has found her passion. She also changes the lives of others such as Len Tsukimori when she helped teach him that music is about heart and not just talent, or helping Shimizu Keiichei finding his "sheet music".

He is a 2nd year student from the Music department. An instrumental prodigy who plays the violin. Although in the beginning he is depicted as cold and strict, he warms up to Hino. Len's world revolves around his violin, even though he reveals that he does not like the violin. His mother is a famous pianist, and his father is a violinist, who both think that music should be played from the heart, but Len did not understand what his parents had meant on that matter, until he had met Hino and fell in love with her. He came to realize these feelings when Hino showed him that music is full of heart and not just dependent on talent. He worries about her, especially when she had hurt her hand trying to help him. Len explains to her how he almost lost the ability to play the violin and the same shouldn't happen to her. He shows her the ropes of the music world.

A popular and handsome 3rd year student with many adoring fans. He has a gentle and graceful demeanor. His specialty is the flute. He has been best friends with Kazuki and supports him in everything he does. He is in the Music department in Seiso High. But later on in the anime and the manga he reveals a darker, hidden side to Hino that he keeps hidden from everyone else, even his best friend, Kazuki Hihara. He finds that he himself is also attracted to Hino, telling himself that when she's around, his "rhythm" is thrown off. He even plays her a song as a way of expressing his feelings without actually telling her.

A 1st year student whose specialty is the cello. He has angelic eyes and often sleeps. His world revolves around his cello, telling Hino that his main schedule is "sleeping, waking up, playing the cello, sleeping again". Other than that he goes to the library frequently and goes to concerts as much as he can. He is called "Sleeping Beauty" for his sleepiness and handsome face. He is a close friend with Hino for helping him find his "sheet music" and often tries incorporating anything that can help the sound of the music. He often reveals secrets about himself with Hino that he wouldn't share with others. He told her that when he sees her or somebody else on stage he often wonders why his music sounds so different. When he smiles Hino also mentions he looks like an angel. He first shows her his sheet music inside a Catholic church where he played Bach's Cello prelude No. 1.

He is a 3rd year student from the Music department. He is the best friend of Azuma and supports him in everything he does. His specialty is the trumpet. He is energetic, loud and carefree, and he loves to eat anything. He has a brother who Hino meets when they are playing basketball in a park. He first discovered the trumpet when a girl was practicing on the roof of the school and tries it out. He is in love with Hino and realizes this when he fell and scraped his elbow and she came to help him. Hihara also came to her rescue when she forgot the notes to "Gavotte" and is like a boy next door. He has "puppy love" feelings towards her.

 /  (young Tsuchiura)

A 2nd year student from the General Education department. He plays soccer and his specialty is the piano. He always helps Hino, because Hino was the reason he started playing piano again. Ryotaro, like Hino, is very straightforward and honest which he shows through his performance in the last selection. He usually says exactly what he thinks, especially to Hino, which means he can get a bit angry, but he is also loving and caring. He is like her older brother who shows his emotions through his piano, like when he choose a Chopin song to show his frustration with not being able to help Hino. He has a deep rivalry with Len and vice versa. He too has feelings for Hino.

She is a 1st year student from the Music department. She's very shy, and she admires Hino very much. Her specialty is the clarinet and she also can play the piano. She often becomes frightened by loud voices. Her parents are rich, so they usually go to her pensions for training and stuff.

 & 

They are best friends with Hino. They help her when she is troubled, and they believe in her.

Lili is a mischievous fairy that gave Hino the magical violin. Very few people can see the fairy other than Hino. It is revealed that the headmaster and the director of the school, Akihiko Kira, can also see the fairy.

Media

References

External links

Official sites
 
La Corda d'Oro: Primo Passo @ TV Tokyo 
Kin'iro no Corda: Primo Passo @ Gamecity.ne.jp 
Kin'iro no Corda (game) @ Gamecity.ne.jp 
Kin'iro no Corda (PSP game) @ Gamecity.ne.jp 
Kin'iro no Corda 2 (PS2 game) @ Gamecity.ne.jp 
Kin'iro no Corda 2 (PSP game) @ Gamecity.ne.jp 
Kin'iro no Corda 3 @ Gamecity.ne.jp 
La Corda d'Oro Blue Sky @ Nippon TV

Other sites

 
2004 manga
2006 anime television series debuts
2009 anime television series debuts
2014 anime television series debuts
Anime television series based on video games
Aniplex
Hakusensha manga
Japan-exclusive video games
Koei games
Koei Tecmo franchises
Madman Entertainment manga
Male harem anime and manga
Manga based on video games
Music in anime and manga
Otome games
PlayStation 2 games
PlayStation Portable games
Romance anime and manga
Sentai Filmworks
Shōjo manga
TV Tokyo original programming
Viz Media manga
Windows games
Works based on Tecmo Koei video games
Video games adapted into comics
Video games adapted into films
Video games adapted into television shows
Video games adapted into novels
Video games developed in Japan
Yumeta Company